Pattalam may refer to:

 Pattalam, Chennai, a residential area in Chennai, Tamil Nadu
 Pattalam (2003 film), an Indian Malayalam-language film directed by Lal Jose
 Pattalam (2009 film), an Indian Tamil-language film directed by Rohan Krishna